Parliamentary elections were held in the Italian Trust Territory of Somaliland on 8 March 1959. Amidst a boycott by the Somali Independent Constitutional Party and the Greater Somalia League, the result was a victory for the ruling Somali Youth League, which won 83 of the 90 seats in the enlarged Legislative Council, despite the party's number of votes falling from 333,820 to 237,134.

Results

References

Parliamentary election
Italian Somaliland
Elections in Somalia
Italian Somaliland parliamentary election
Election and referendum articles with incomplete results